Urinator can refer to:

 A former scientific name for the loon, a bird (British English: diver)
 Someone who urinates
 Underwater diver (an obsolete word)
 Gyrinus urinator, a species of whirligig beetle

See also
Whizzinator